The Carnival of Hits Tour 2000 is a re-issued live album by Australian band The Seekers. The album was originated released in 2002 under the title Night of Nights... Live!. The album was recorded in 2000 with fans in Australia and New Zealand from 18 February to 16 April, and later through the UK from 29 May to 6 June. The album was re-released in August 2019 under the title The Carnival of Hits Tour 2000.

Reception
A reviewer at Marbecks NZ said "This Carnival of Hits Tour 2000 concert captures The Seekers at their absolute best and is, without question, the crowing jewel in their live recording cache. A vocal tour-de-force from all four Seekers, that crystal-clear sound so superbly enhanced by the group's long-time record producer Michael Cristiano's expert mixing and mastering."

Track listing
CD 1
 "You Can Tell the World"
 "Love Is Kind, Love Is Wine"
 "When the Stars Begin To Fall"
 "This Train"
 "Morningtown Ride"
 "When Will the Good Apples Fall?"
 "Red Rubber Ball" 
 "'Puff the Magic Dragon"
 "I Am Australian"
 "The Light for the Lighthouse"
 "Open Up Them Pearly Gates" / "We Shall Not Be Moved" (Medley)

CD 2
 "I'll Never Find Another You"
 "Someday, One Day"
 "Walk With Me"
 "The Shores of Avalon"
 "You're My Spirit"
 "Colours of My Life"
 "The Bush Girl"
 "Myra"
 "Just a Closer Walk with Thee"
 "Ten Thousand Years Ago"
 "This Is My Song"
 "Keep a Dream in Your Pocket"
 "Georgy Girl"
 "The Carnival Is Over"
 "A World of Our Own"

Release history

References

Live albums by Australian artists
Sony Music Australia albums
The Seekers albums
2019 live albums
Universal Records live albums
Decca Records live albums